A winter storm warning (SAME code: WSW) is a hazardous weather statement issued by Weather Forecast Offices (WFO) of the National Weather Service (NWS) in the United States to alert the public that a winter storm is occurring or is about to occur in the area, usually within 36 hours of the storm's onset.

A similar warning is issued by Environment and Climate Change Canada (ECCC) through local forecast offices of the Meteorological Service of Canada.

Definition
A warning can also be issued during high impact events of lesser amounts, usually early or very late in the season when trees have leaves and damage can result.

Usually, a large accumulation of ice alone with little to no snow will result in an ice storm warning, or in the case of light freezing rain, a winter weather advisory, a freezing rain advisory, or a freezing drizzle advisory. In lieu of issuing such a statement separately, Winter Storm Warnings can include verbiage indicative of a wind chill advisory or a wind chill warning, if potentially life-threatening wind chill values (determined by local criteria) are forecast to accompany winter precipitation during the warning's duration.

Beginning with the 2008–09 meteorological winter, the National Weather Service consolidated individual precipitation-specific bulletins for winter storms expected to create heavy snowfall (heavy snow warning), lake-effect snow (lake effect snow warning) or sleet accumulations (sleet warning or heavy sleet warning) within the warned area, replacing them with variants of the Winter Storm Warning product outlining the accordant hazards being forecast:
 Winter storm warning for heavy snow  Replaced the heavy snow warning
 Winter storm warning for heavy wet snow  Same as above, except when the snow will also be wet
 Winter storm warning for heavy snow and blowing snow  When the criteria for both a WSW for heavy snow and a winter weather advisory for snow and blowing snow are met [near-blizzard conditions]
 Winter storm warning for heavy sleet  Replaced the sleet warning
 Winter storm warning for heavy snow and ice  When both the criteria for a WSW for heavy snow and an ice storm warning are met
 Winter storm warning for snow and ice  When both the criteria for a winter weather advisory for snow and an ice storm warning are met
 Winter storm warning for sleet and freezing rain  When both the criteria for a winter weather advisory for sleet and an ice storm warning are met
 Winter storm warning for heavy lake-effect snow  Replaced the lake effect snow warning in some NWS county warning areas. (2017-2018 season)

Additionally, all of the above warning types may also include verbiage indicative of a wind advisory to indicate strong winds that are expected to accompany the precipitation (e.g., "winter storm warning for heavy wet snow and strong winds").

The generic "winter storm warning" terminology may be used on its own, typically to indicate that all types of winter precipitation (as a mixture or in periods before transitioning between types) are expected in high amounts; however, it may be defined generically at the forecaster's discretion regardless of whether or not this condition is met.

Example of a winter storm warning

URGENT - WINTER WEATHER MESSAGE
National Weather Service Grand Rapids MI
331 PM EDT Fri Apr 13 2018

MIZ037>040-043>046-050>052-140345-
/O.NEW.KGRR.WS.W.0003.180414T0900Z-180415T1600Z/
Mason-Lake-Osceola-Clare-Oceana-Newaygo-Mecosta-Isabella-Muskegon-
Montcalm-Gratiot-
Including the cities of Ludington, Baldwin, Reed City, Clare, 
Hart, Fremont, Big Rapids, Mount Pleasant, Muskegon, Greenville, 
and Alma
331 PM EDT Fri Apr 13 2018

...WINTER STORM WARNING IN EFFECT FROM 5 AM SATURDAY TO NOON EDT
SUNDAY...

* WHAT...Heavy mixed precipitation expected. Total snow and sleet
  accumulations of two to four inches and ice accumulations of a
  quarter to half an inch are expected.

* WHERE...Portions of central and west central Michigan.

* WHEN...From 5 AM Saturday to noon EDT Sunday.

* ADDITIONAL DETAILS...Expect power outages and tree damage due 
  to the ice. Travel will be impossible. Tree branches could 
  fall. Expect significant reductions in visibility at times.

PRECAUTIONARY/PREPAREDNESS ACTIONS...

A Winter Storm Warning means significant amounts of snow, sleet
and ice will make travel very hazardous or impossible. Strong
winds are also expected.

&&

$$

See also
Severe weather terminology (United States)

References

External links
 National Weather Service
 Federal Emergency Management Agency
 Meteorological Service of Canada

Weather warnings and advisories